Olive Rush (June 10, 1873 near Fairmount, Indiana – August 20, 1966 in Santa Fe, New Mexico) was a painter, illustrator, muralist, and an important pioneer in Native American art education. Her paintings are held in a number of private collections and museums, including: the Brooklyn Museum of New York City, the Haan Mansion Museum of Indiana Art, the Indianapolis Museum of Art, Indiana and the Smithsonian American Art Museum.

Early life 
Rush was the fourth of Nixon and Louisa Rush's six children. The Rush family lived on a farm in Grant County, Indiana where they were members of the local Society of Friends. Olive kept diaries at the age of 13 in 1886, writing about her life, school lessons, and going sledding in Indiana winters. Part of the entries include working on a dialogue for class, going to lectures ("although it took some crying on my part"), and chores such as washing.

Education
Olive Rush studied at Earlham College, the art school associated with the Corcoran Gallery of Art and at the Art Students League before becoming an illustrator in New York. In 1904 she moved to Wilmington, Delaware, to study with Howard Pyle, and she stayed until 1910. She spent the next year in Europe studying British and French painters, and finished her art education at the Boston Museum School in 1912. In 1913 Rush returned to Europe with her friend, the watercolorist Alice Schille, visiting Belgium and France. In 1947, Earlham College gave her an honorary Doctorate in Fine Arts.

Career
In 1914 Rush, with her father, visited New Mexico and Arizona, and she had a one-person exhibition at the Palace of the Governors in Santa Fe. She made several visits to New Mexico over the next couple of years and moved permanently to Santa Fe in 1920. Despite the relative isolation of Santa Fe, Rush continued to contribute to national and international shows over the next thirty years, which activity culminated in a retrospective at the Museum of New Mexico Art Gallery in 1957.

Her former studio on Canyon Road in Santa Fe is now the home to the Santa Fe Quaker Meeting, as well as having guest house facilities available on the site.

Rush considered her major influences to be early Chinese art, Japanese art, and El Greco. She was also inspired by the colorful style of Hopi and other Puebloan artists of the 1930s and 1940s.

Murals
Murals were produced from 1934 to 1943 in the United States through the Section of Painting and Sculpture, later called the Section of Fine Arts, of the Treasury Department. The murals were intended to boost the morale of the American people from the effects of the Depression by depicting uplifting subjects. Almost 850 artists were commissioned to paint 1371 murals, most of which were installed in post offices, libraries, and other public buildings. 162 of the artists were women. The murals were funded as a part of the cost of the construction with 1% of the cost set aside for artistic enhancements.

Olive Rush was commissioned by the Section of Fine Arts to complete painted murals for several public buildings in the American West. In Santa Fe, New Mexico she completed The Library Reaches the People, a fresco at the public library (now part of the New Mexico History Museum), as well as at the hotel La Fonda.  In Pawhuska, Oklahoma she completed an oil on canvas mural, Osage Treaties for the  post office.  In Florence, Colorado she painted Antelope for the post office. Lastly, she completed two frescos, Cotton Industry and Farming and Natural History of Plant and Animal Life for the Foster Hall Biology Building at New Mexico State University. Also, her mural for the Maisel's Trading Post on Central in Albuquerque is still in place. She taught mural painting to students at the Santa Fe Indian School, which is now the Institute of American Indian Arts.

Museum and gallery holdings 
Houston (MFA): The Huntress (c. 1938, watercolour)
Indianapolis (MA): Woman at Loom (c. 1907, oil on academy board); On the Balcony (oil on canvas)
Lincoln (Sheldon Memorial AG, University of Nebraska): Food Bearers (1923, oil on canvas)
New York (Brooklyn Mus.): Deer Path (watercolour)
Norman (Fred Jones Jr. MA, University of Oklahoma): The White Sands (with fox) (c. 1925, oil on panel)
Roswell (Mus. and Art Center): Weird Land (c. 1934); The Apple from the Sea Returning (c. 1935, watercolour)
Santa Fe (Mus. of New Mexico, MFA): collection of works, including After War - Frustration (oil); Indian Children at San Xavier (oil); Portrait of Mary Austin (c. 1933); Viaducts and Villages (c. 1950, watercolour)
Washington DC (Phillips Collection): On the Mesa (c. 1925, oil on cardboard); Charros at Rodeo (1929, watercolour on board)
Washington DC (Smithsonian American AM): Olive Rush papers, 1879-1967
Wilmington (Delaware AM): Gazelle Grazing (oil); Interior of the Howard Pyle Studio (c. 1911, watercolour and pastel)
Worcester (AM): Edge of the Forest (c. 1928, watercolour); Fallow Deer (c. 1928, watercolour over graphite)

During Rush’s lifetime, her paintings were acquired by numerous museums and many private collectors. One of her most famous paintings, Girl on Turquoise Horse, was purchased by Lou Hoover, wife of President Herbert Hoover. Some of her lesser known works are held by her closest living relatives, the Rush and Beasley family, in various parts of Indiana, Michigan, the Carolinas, the West Coast, and Santa Fe, New Mexico.

Notes

References

External links

Olive Rush Papers Online at the Smithsonian Archives of American Art
Santa Fe Friends (Quaker) Meeting at the Former Olive Rush Studio
Santa Fe Hillside at New Mexico Museum of Art

1873 births
1966 deaths
American muralists
American Quakers
American art educators
Artists from Santa Fe, New Mexico
Earlham College alumni
Painters from Indiana
American women painters
20th-century American painters
Corcoran School of the Arts and Design alumni
Art Students League of New York alumni
American women illustrators
American illustrators
Painters from New Mexico
People of the New Deal arts projects
20th-century American women artists
Women muralists
Educators from New York City
American women educators